The 1888 United States presidential election in Mississippi took place on November 6, 1888, as part of the 1888 United States presidential election. Voters chose three representatives, or electors to the Electoral College, who voted for president and vice president.

Mississippi voted for the Democratic nominee, incumbent President Grover Cleveland, over the Republican nominee, Benjamin Harrison. Cleveland won the state by a margin of 47.81%.

Results

See also
 United States presidential elections in Mississippi

Notes

References

Mississippi
1888
1888 Mississippi elections